Out of Eden: The Hits is the final album by Christian urban-pop trio Out of Eden. It contains one new song as well as eleven classic Out of Eden songs. The album was released on August 1, 2006 on Gotee Records. This features songs from all six albums and one brand new song.

Track listing
Lovely Day - from "Lovin' The Day"
More Than You Know - from "More Than You Know"
Greater Love - from "More Than You Know"
River - from "No Turning Back"
Window - from "No Turning Back"
Different Now - from "This Is Your Life"
Meditate - from "This Is Your Life"
Rolling Stone - from "This Is Your Life"
Love, Peace, And Happiness - from "Love, Peace & Happiness"
Soldiers - from "Love, Peace & Happiness"
God Will Take Care Of You - from "Hymns"
Mighty Mighty Good - new song

Gotee Records compilation albums
2006 compilation albums
Out of Eden albums